Megachile melanota is a species of bee in the family Megachilidae. It was described by Pérez in 1895.

References

Melanota
Insects described in 1895